Victoria Vesna (born 1959) is a professor and digital media artist. She is known for her feminist video, computer and internet art and has been active since the early 1980s. Along with collaborator Jim Gimzewski she is thought to have created one of the first interactive artworks related to nanotechnology (sometimes called nanoart) and defines her art practice as experimental research.

Early life and education
Victoria Vesna was born in Washington D.C. on June 9, 1959. She graduated from the High School of Art & Design in New York City, NY in 1976.  She received a Fine Arts Diploma from the University of Belgrade, Yugoslavia in 1984. In 2000, she completed her Ph.D. at CAiiA (The Centre for Advanced Studies in Interactive Arts) at the University of Wales with a thesis entitled "Networked Public Spaces: An Investigation into Virtual Embodiment" in 2000.

Career

Teaching 
Victoria Vesna was the chair of the Department of Design Media Arts at the UCLA School of the Arts and Architecture as well as director of UCLA's Art|Sci Center and the UC Digital Arts Research Network.

Awards 
She received the Oscar Signorini award for best net artwork in 1998 and the CINE Golden Eagle award for best scientific documentary in 1986.

Artwork 
Through creative research, she examines perception and identity shifts in connection with scientific innovation as well as examining bio and nanotechnology through art.

Exhibitions include Spaceship Earth at the Centre of Contemporary Art Znaki Czasu in Toruń (2011) and MORPHONANO at the Beall Center for Art and Technology, Irvine, California (2012).

Artweek reviewer Claudine Isé writes, “Vesna has created a number of Web-based works that examine the dichotomy between concepts of “virtual’ and ‘concrete.’ Her on-line projects include an upcoming electronic conference about the cultural production of death as well as a popular site called Bodies INCorporated, which gives visitors an opportunity to design their own ‘cyber bodies’ from a selection of organic and synthetic textures, such as water, lava, chocolate, rubber or plastic.”

Author 
In Christopher Hanson's review of her book Database aesthetics: Art in the age of information overflow, he says that Vesna provides an engaging collection of essays about changing aesthetics in interactive art and its relationship to the database.

Personal life
Formerly married to Bogdan Maglich, Vesna has two children by that marriage, which ended in divorce.

Works
[Alien] Star Dust (2019–present)
Noise Aquarium (2016–present)
Brainstorming (2015–present)
Bodies Corp 2.0 (2015)
Octopus Mandala Glow (2013), in collaboration with Ray Zimmerman, Dawn Faelnar, Mike Datz, Peter Rand, Steven Amrhein, and others
ACOUSTIC NETWORKS OF BIRDS (2012), in collaboration with biologist Charles Taylor and physicist Takashi Ikegami
Quantum Tunneling (2008)
Water Bowls (2006)
Mood Swings (2006) 
Datamining Bodies (2004) in collaboration with Gerald de Jong and David Beaudry
Zero@wavefunction (2002) in collaboration with nanoscientist James Gimzewski
Cell Ghosts (2001) 
Building a Community of People with No Time (2001)
Datamining Bodies (1999)
Bodies© InCorporated (1996)
Virtual Concrete (1995) 
Nanomandala 
Another Day in Paradise (1992)

Publications
Database aesthetics: Art in the age of information overflow (2007), University Of Minnesota Press.
Mel Chin-Provocative Eco-Art in Action Academic journal article from Art Journal, Vol. 65, No. 1. 
Toward a Third Culture: Being In Between Art and Electronic Media. Phaidon Press. 2008.

Exhibitions

Solo exhibitions 
MORPHONANO: Beall Center for Art and Technology, Irvine, California (2012)*Spaceship Earth: Centre of Contemporary Art Znaki Czasu in Torun (2011)
Hox Zodiac: Microwave International New Media Arts Festival ALCHEMY, School of Creative Media, City University of Hong Kong, Hong Kong.(2011)
Quantum Tunneling: Median Kunst Labor (Media Art Laboratory), Graz, Austria.(2008)
Cell Ghosts: Apeejay Media Gallery, New Delhi.(2005)
Zero@wavefunction: Biennale for Electronic Arts, Perth. John Curtin University of Technology, Perth, Australia. (2002)

Group exhibitions 
 TechNoBody, Pelham Art Center, New York, NY (2015)
 "Red Angel," Installation. Art & Science, Aperto '86, Venice Biennale, Italy (1986)

References

External links
 Artist website: http://victoriavesna.com
 Artist talk: http://vimeo.com/52159955
Social Media
Facebook: https://www.facebook.com/vivesna/
Instagram: https://www.instagram.com/victoriavesna/
Twitter: https://twitter.com/vivesna

American people of Serbian descent
People from Washington, D.C.
American artists
1959 births
Living people
University of Belgrade alumni
Alumni of the University of Wales
UCLA School of the Arts and Architecture faculty
Internet art
Digital artists
American installation artists